Vromos Island is a rocky island 600 m long in east-west direction and 260 m wide lying in Perrier Bay on the northwest coast of Anvers Island in the Palmer Archipelago, Antarctica.  It is separated from Trebishte Island to the south by a 300 m wide passage.

The island is named after Vromos Bay on the Bulgarian Black Sea Coast.

Location

British mapping in 1980.

Maps
 British Antarctic Territory.  Scale 1:200000 topographic map.  DOS 610 Series, Sheet W 64 62.  Directorate of Overseas Surveys, UK, 1980.
 Antarctic Digital Database (ADD). Scale 1:250000 topographic map of Antarctica. Scientific Committee on Antarctic Research (SCAR). Since 1993, regularly upgraded and updated.

References
 Bulgarian Antarctic Gazetteer. Antarctic Place-names Commission. (details in Bulgarian, basic data in English)
 Vromos Island. SCAR Composite Antarctic Gazetteer.

External links
 Vromos Island. Copernix satellite image

Islands of the Palmer Archipelago
Bulgaria and the Antarctic